Rita Tori (born Marguerite Thoresen; 17 June 1908 – 16 August 1967) was an international noted, Norwegian ballet dancer and choreographer.

She was born to Norwegian parents living in Shanghai, China. Her father, Olaf Thoresen (1870-1937), managed a Chinese-based Norwegian trading company (Det Oversøiske Compagnie). She studied ballet from an early age, training in both London and Paris. Among other dance instructors, she studied under Lyubov Yegorova.

She debuted at the Opéra de Monte-Carlo in 1930. She danced in René Blums Ballets de Monte Carlo in 1936 and opened a dance academy in Oslo that same year. From 1953 to 1958, she was the Director of the Norwegian Ballet (Den Norske Ballett).

During the occupation of Norway by Nazi Germany she was imprisoned in Åkebergveien from 21 September 1944, then in Grini concentration camp from 3 November 1944 until her release on 26 March 1945.

Death
She died in Norway in 1967 and was awarded the Norwegian King's Medal of Merit upon her death.

References

1908 births
1967 deaths
Norwegian ballerinas
Grini concentration camp survivors